Arulampalam is a surname. Notable people with the surname include:

 C. Arulampalam (1909–1997), Sri Lankan politician
 Wiji Arulampalam, British economist and professor